La Victoria Airport  is an airstrip near the town of La Victoria in Alto Paraguay Department, Paraguay.

Aerial imagery from 2005 shows low brush covering the length of the runway.

See also

 List of airports in Paraguay
 Transport in Paraguay

References

External links
 HERE Maps - Puerto La Victoria
 OpenStreetMap - Puerto La Victoria
 OurAirports - Puerto La Victoria
 Puerto La Victoria

Airports in Paraguay